AEE may refer to:

Education 
Acadiana Educational Endowment, an educational organization in Louisiana
Alliance for Excellent Education, an American educational organization
Association for Experiential Education, an American educational organization

Energy companies 
Ameren Corporation, an electric utility company that trades under AEE on the NYSE
Atomenergoexport, a predecessor of Atomstroyexport, the Russian Federation's nuclear power equipment and service export monopoly
Puerto Rico Electric Power Authority, Puerto Rico's public electric power company

Other uses 
All-England Eleven, a non-international England cricket team
Assessment of Environmental Effects, part of a resource consent under the Resource Management Act 1991, New Zealand
Association of Energy Engineers, an American energy engineering society
AVN Adult Entertainment Expo, an annual trade show held in Las Vegas, Nevada
Aegean Airlines
Adareil Airstrip, an airstrip in South Sudan (See: List of airports in South Sudan)
aee, ISO 639-3 code of the Northeast Pashayi language